M180 or M-180 may refer to:

M180 motorway, a major road in England
M-180 (Michigan highway), a former state highway in Michigan
Mercedes-Benz M180 engine